Harder, Fatter + Louder! is a compilation album released November 22, 2010 by Fat Wreck Chords as the seventh volume in the label's Fat Music series. It marked the resumption of the series after an eight-year gap since 2002's Uncontrollable Fatulence. During the intervening years Fat Wreck Chords had moved from compact discs toward digital downloads for its samplers, curtailing the Fat Music series and instead releasing compilation albums themed around social and political causes. These included the benefit albums Liberation (2003) and Protect (2005), and the two volumes of Rock Against Bush released preceding the 2004 United States presidential election. Harder, Fatter + Louder! resumed the Fat Music series by featuring solely artists from the label's roster, with tracks selected from current and upcoming releases.

Track listing

External links 
Harder, Fatter + Louder! at Fat Wreck Chords

2010 albums
Punk rock compilation albums